Mane Belaku is a 1975 Indian Kannada-language film, directed by Y. R. Swamy and produced by A. R. S. Sharma. The film stars Chandrashekar, K. S. Ashwath, Balakrishna and Ramgopal. The film has musical score by M. Ranga Rao.

Cast

Chandrashekar
K. S. Ashwath
Balakrishna
Ramgopal
M. S. Sathya
Kuppuraj
Dheerendra Gopal
Bheemaraj
Shivakumar
Raghava
Raju
Amar
Master nataraj
Vittal
Bangalore Nagesh in Guest Appearance
Chandrakala
B. V. Radha
Ramaprabha
B. Jayashree
M. N. Lakshmidevi
Papamma
Baby Madhushree
Rajesh in Guest Appearance

Soundtrack
The music was composed by M. Ranga Rao.

References

External links
 
 

1975 films
1970s Kannada-language films
Films scored by M. Ranga Rao
Films directed by Y. R. Swamy